Jupiter LV, provisionally known as , is a natural satellite of Jupiter. It was discovered by a team of astronomers led by Brett J. Gladman in 2003.

 is about 2 kilometres in diameter, and orbits Jupiter at an average distance of 20.220 Gm in 604.99 days, at an inclination of 143° to the ecliptic (145° to Jupiter's equator), in a retrograde direction and with an eccentricity of 0.0509.

It belongs to the Ananke group, retrograde irregular moons that orbit Jupiter between 22.8 and 24.1 Gm, at inclinations of roughly 150-155°.

The moon was lost following its discovery in 2003. It was recovered in 2017 and given its permanent designation that year.

References

Ananke group
Moons of Jupiter
Irregular satellites
20030404
Discoveries by Brett J. Gladman
Moons with a retrograde orbit